Princess Lalla Abla bint Tahar (5 September 1909 – 1 March 1992) was the second wife of Mohammed V of Morocco.

She was the daughter of Moulay Mohammed al-Tahar bin Hassan, a son of Sultan Hassan I of Morocco and twin brother of Sultan Moulay Yusef. She also had Glaoua origins,  Abdessadeq el Glaoui explained in his 2004 publication that "Lalla Abla was chosen in the house Glaoui".

She married her first cousin Sultan Mohammed V of Morocco in 1928 or 1926. Her elder sister Princess Lalla Hania bint Tahar married Sultan Mohammed Ben Aarafa of Morocco.

She had five children: 
 Hassan II (9 July 1929 – 23 July 1999).
 Lalla Aicha (17 June 1931 – 4 September 2011).
 Lalla Malika (14 March 1933 – 28 September 2021).
 Moulay Abdallah (30 July 1935 – 20 December 1983).
 Lalla Nuzha (29 October 1940 – 2 September 1977).

Her oldest sister, Lalla Hania bint Tahar, married Mohammed V's distant relative Mohammed Ben Aarafa, who claimed the Moroccan throne with the support of the French protectorate administration during the administration's 1953–1955 exile of Mohammed V to Madagascar.

Legacy
The Lalla Abla Mosque on the Port of Tangier was dedicated in July 2018 by her grandson, King Mohammed VI.

Notes

20th-century Moroccan women
1909 births
1992 deaths
Moroccan exiles in Madagascar
Moroccan royalty
Moroccan princesses 
'Alawi dynasty